There are risks associated with never-done-before technologies like the construction and operation of a space elevator.  A space elevator would present a navigational hazard, both to aircraft and spacecraft.  Aircraft could be dealt with by means of simple air-traffic control restrictions.  Impacts by space objects such as meteoroids, satellites and micrometeorites pose a more difficult problem for construction and operation of a space elevator.

Satellites
If nothing were done, essentially all satellites with perigees below the top of the elevator would eventually collide with the elevator cable.

Failure cascade
For stability, it is not enough that other fibers be able to take over the load of a failed strand — the system must also survive the immediate, dynamical effects of fiber failure, which generates projectiles aimed at the cable itself. Unless these fast-moving projectiles can be stopped safely, they will break yet other fibers, initiating a failure cascade capable of severing the cable. The challenge of preventing fiber breakage from initiating a catastrophic failure cascade seems to be unaddressed in the current literature on terrestrial space elevators. Problems of this sort would be easier to solve in lower-tension applications (e.g., lunar elevators). This problem has been described by physicist Freeman Dyson.

Corrosion
Corrosion is thought by some to be a risk to any thinly built tether (which most designs call for). In the upper atmosphere, atomic oxygen steadily eats away at most materials.

Other analyses show atomic oxygen to be a non-problem in practice.

Radiation and Van Allen belts

Most of the space elevator structure would lay inside the Van Allen radiation belt, and the space elevator would run through the Van Allen belts. This is not a problem for most freight, but the amount of time a climber spends in this region would cause radiation poisoning to any unshielded human or other living things.

Furthermore, the effectiveness of the magnetosphere to deflect radiation emanating from the sun decreases dramatically after rising several earth radii above the surface. This ionising radiation may cause damage to materials within both the tether and climbers.

For a space elevator to be used by human passengers, the Van Allen radiation belt must therefore be emptied of its charged particles. This has been proposed by the High Voltage Orbiting Long Tether project.

In the event of failure

Cut near the anchor point
If the elevator is cut at its anchor point on Earth's surface, the outward force exerted by the counterweight would cause the entire elevator to rise upward into a higher orbit, or escape Earth's gravity altogether.

Cut up to about 25,000 km

Cut above 25,000 km
If the break occurred at the counterweight side of the elevator, the lower portion, now including the "central station" of the elevator, would begin to fall down and would continue down to reentry if no part of the cable below failed as well.  Depending on the size, it would either burn up on re-entry or impact the surface.  A mechanism to immediately sever the cable below the station would prevent reentry of the station and result in its continuation in a high and slightly modified orbit.  Simulations have shown that as the descending portion of the space elevator "wraps around" Earth, the stress on the remaining length of cable increases, resulting in its upper sections breaking off and being flung away. The details of how these pieces break and the trajectories they take are highly sensitive to initial conditions.

See also

References

External links
 Elevator:2010  Space elevator prize competitions
 The Space Elevator Reference
 Audacious & Outrageous: Space Elevators
 

safety